This article lists players who have captained the senior Kerry county hurling team in the Christy Ring Cup, Joe McDonagh Cup, the Munster Senior Hurling Championship and the All-Ireland Senior Hurling Championship.

List of captains

References

Hurling
+Captains
Kerry